Real Bout Fatal Fury Special is a 1997 fighting game released by SNK for the Neo Geo platform. It is the sixth installment in the Fatal Fury series and the second game in the Real Bout sub-series, following the original Real Bout Fatal Fury. Real Bout Fatal Fury Special features all new graphics and returns to the two-level plane system from Fatal Fury 2. The game was later included in Fatal Fury Battle Archives Vol. 2, a compilation released for the PlayStation 2. In March 2017, this compilation was re-released in the PlayStation Store on the PlayStation 4.

Gameplay 

Though gameplay is two-dimensional, characters can move between two different planes during battle. Breaking an opponent through one of the barriers located on either side of a stage causes them to become stunned.

Characters 

The game retains the cast of the original Real Bout, with the addition of Tung Fu Rue, Cheng Sinzan, Laurence Blood, and Wolfgang Krauser from Fatal Fury Special, with Krauser serving as the new final boss. Geese Howard, who was canonically killed off in his own KOF tournament during the previous game, appears in this game as a hidden final boss in a special "Nightmare Match" and as an unlockable playable character in the home versions, Geese’s alive appearance is because of his own ending from the original Real Bout where it takes place after he reigns victorious in his own tournament. The game also features hidden "extra" versions of Andy Bogard, Billy Kane, Blue Mary, and Tung Fu Rue for a total of 23 characters (24 if counting Geese).

Development

Release 

The game was ported to the Neo-Geo CD with several additions such as a Versus mode and a music video starring Blue Mary that is shown to the player after completing the Arcade mode following the credits. This port also saw a release for the Sega Saturn, using the 1MB RAM cartridge expansion of the system in order to retain sprite animations.

A port of Real Bout Special titled Real Bout Fatal Fury Special: Dominated Mind was released for the PlayStation in 1998 only in Japan, which adds Alfred from Real Bout Fatal Fury 2 (which had been released a couple of months prior on the Neo Geo) as a playable character, and includes an all new boss character named White (modeled after the character Alexander "Alex" DeLarge from A Clockwork Orange). This port adds animated videos for game's intro and character's endings. These cut scenes were produced by Sunrise. The story of this version centers around White's brainwashing of Billy Kane and attempted takeover of Southtown's underworld in the power vacuum left by Geese Howard's death in  the original Real Bout. In this version, Geese sports a halo over his head, a reference to his passing in the original Real Bout. Dominated Mind also features new moves, hidden unlockable super moves, super cancelling (known in the game as "Final Impacts"), and removed the two line battle system from the game. The extra versions of Andy, Billy, Mary, and Tung are removed.

The Game Boy version, titled , was released only in Japan on March 27, 1998, featuring simplified graphics and two-button gameplay. This version features only 12 playable characters: a roster which consists of Terry, Andy, Joe, Mai, Blue Mary, Duck King, Kim, Jin Chonrei, Billy, Yamazaki, Laurence, and Krauser. Geese Howard appears as a hidden character, as well as Iori Yagami from The King of Fighters series.

Reception 

In Japan, Game Machine listed Real Bout Fatal Fury Special on their March 1, 1997 issue as being the most-successful arcade game of the month. The game was a success in the arcades. According to Famitsu, both the AES and Neo Geo CD versions sold over 9,169 and 20,246 copies in their first week on the market respectively.

Notes

References

External links 
 Real Bout Fatal Fury Special at GameFAQs
 Real Bout Fatal Fury Special at Giant Bomb
 Real Bout Fatal Fury Special at Killer List of Videogames
 Real Bout Fatal Fury Special at MobyGames

1997 video games
ACA Neo Geo games
Arcade video games
D4 Enterprise games
Fatal Fury
Fighting games
Game Boy games
Multiplayer and single-player video games
Neo Geo games
Neo Geo CD games
Nintendo Switch games
PlayStation (console) games
PlayStation Network games
PlayStation 4 games
Sega Saturn games
SNK games
SNK Playmore games
Virtual Console games
Video games set in the United States
Video games set in Japan
Video games set in Brazil
Video games set in South Korea
Video games set in China
Video games set in Hong Kong
Video games set in Germany
Video games developed in Japan
Xbox One games
Hamster Corporation games